The United Nations Information Centre for India and Bhutan is based in New Delhi, India. It is one of 63  United Nations Information Centres (UNICs) located worldwide.

These centres work globally under the direction of the Department of Public Information (DPI) of the United Nations Secretariat. Their objective is to keep the United Nations (UN) closer to the people of the world by delivering its messages  in people's national and regional languages. The United Nations Information Centre for India and Bhutan plays an important role in the development of media outreach by to maintaining, broadcasting, and communicating information from the United Nations to India and Bhutan.

Scope

The Centre's main purpose is to reach out to media and educational groups. It engages in associations with government, local civil society organizations and the private sector. It maintains off-line resources such as libraries, and also looks after digital information resources. To make communication easier and more usable, it translates information in the local languages of India including Hindi, Tamil, and Telugu. It also participates in observances of international days, years and decades by memorable events such as honouring presentations on national and local notable persons, educational seminars, sports, music and drawing competitions.

Activities

The core objective of the United Nations Information Centre for India and Bhutan is to bring the United Nations closer to the people. It has been involved in many activities, including:

 Representing information related to the United Nations to students, educational and academic centres, research centres, media houses, and governmental and non-governmental bodies, by translating information into local languages
 Making people aware of initiatives and programmes undertaken by the United Nations
 Presenting workflow of projects of the UN
 Helping India-based UN agencies for required strategies of communication 
 Associating government ministries of states and centres during celebration events of international days   
 Organizing workshops, seminars, and conferences on UN objectives and bottom line by partnering with local civil society organizations 
 Preparing and engaging students through cultural events and competitions like quizzes, drawing, music and sports
 Maintaining the libraries and digital resources of the United Nations Information Centres (UNICs)

UNIC Director

Derk Segaar is the current Director of United Nations Information Centre for India and Bhutan. Appointed by  United Nations Secretary-General António Guterres, he had worked for the United Nations for over ten years in the field of humanitarian affairs and peacekeeping, at the headquarters in New York City and other regions.

Location
The United Nations Information Centre for India and Bhutan is located at 55, Lodhi Estate, New Delhi 110003, India.

References

External links
 United Nations Information Centre for India and Bhutan, official website
 United Nations in Bhutan
 UNIC Library

United Nations organizations based in Asia
Intergovernmental organizations established by treaty
Organisations based in Delhi
India and the United Nations
Bhutan and the United Nations